The Patagonian forest earthcreeper (Upucerthia saturatior), also known as the forest earthcreeper, is a species of bird in the ovenbird family Furnariidae. The species was described in 1900 by W.E.D. Scott, but was listed as a subspecies of the scale-throated earthcreeper in Chapman in 1919. A 2009 paper elevated it back up to species status.

The Patagonian forest earthcreeper is found in central Chile (Valparaíso Region and Los Lagos Region) and western Argentina. Despite its name, its Chilean range of distribution is located outside of Patagonia.

It is thought to undertake some movements during the winter, with some individuals possibly crossing the Andes.

References

Patagonian forest earthcreeper
Birds of Chile
Birds of Patagonia
Patagonian forest earthcreeper